Joseph Guillaume François "Jef" Denyn (19 March 1862 – 2 October 1941) was a carillon player from Mechelen, Belgium. He originally studied to be an engineer. His carilloning career started in 1881 when his father, the official carilloneer of Mechelen, went blind and became unable to play. This caused Denyn to take over. In 1887 Denyn was recognised for his skills and officially appointed to the same position his father had held. He used his engineering knowledge to vastly improve the technology surrounding carillons, which is now used all over Europe and the United States. In 1922, he founded the world's first and most renowned international higher institute of campanology, later named after him, the Royal Carillon School "Jef Denyn" in Mechelen.

During the First World War, he, his wife Helene, son and four daughters were among those Belgian refugees who fled to England. The Denyn family were taken in by organist and musicologist William Wooding Starmer (1866–1927) in his house in Tunbridge Wells.

External links
 Official website of Jef Denyn's Carillon School
 Biography of Jef Denyn on SVM

1862 births
1941 deaths
19th-century Belgian musicians
19th-century composers
20th-century Belgian musicians
20th-century composers
Belgian expatriates in the United Kingdom
Carillonneurs
Composers for carillon
Musicians from Mechelen
Belgian composers
Male composers
19th-century Belgian male musicians
20th-century Belgian male musicians